The Confederation of Regions Party fielded six candidates in the 1995 Ontario provincial election, none of whom were elected.  Information about these candidates may be found here.

James MacLeod (Scarborough—Ellesmere)
MacLeod worked a registered nurse in the Toronto area during the mid-1990s.  He campaigned for the House of Commons of Canada in the 1993 federal election as a candidate of the environment-based Green Party, arguing that a renewed government investment in environmental concerns would result the creation of in 20,000 to 50,000 new jobs(Toronto Star, 22 October 1993).  He received 276 votes (0.70%), finishing sixth against Liberal incumbent Tom Wappel.  MacLeod also ran for a seat on the Scarborough school board in 1994, but was defeated.

MacLeod was 45 years old at the time of the 1995 election.  He continued to emphasize environmental themes despite having crossed to the Confederation of Regions Party, calling for environmentally friendly industry and full employment (Toronto Star, 1 June 1995).  He received 745 votes, finishing fourth against Progressive Conservative candidate Marilyn Mushinski.

Candidates in Ontario provincial elections
Ontario Provincial Confederation of Regions Party politicians